Necdet Cici (26 June 1912 – 1995) was a Turkish footballer. He played in one match for the Turkey national football team in 1932. He was also part of Turkey's squad for the football tournament at the 1936 Summer Olympics, but he did not play in any matches.

References

External links
 

1912 births
1995 deaths
Turkish footballers
Turkey international footballers
Place of birth missing
Association football midfielders
Galatasaray S.K. footballers